Section 25 may refer to:

Section 25 (band), an English post-punk and electronic band
 Section 25 of the Canadian Charter of Rights and Freedoms
 Section 25 of the Constitution of Australia

See also